Géza Grünwald (October 18, 1910, Budapest – September 7, 1943)  was a Hungarian mathematician of Jewish heritage who worked on analysis. He died in the Holocaust.

See also
 Grunwald–Wang theorem

References

20th-century Hungarian mathematicians
1910 births
1943 deaths
Hungarian Jews who died in the Holocaust
Hungarian civilians killed in World War II